Cuevo Airport  was an airstrip  south of Cuevo in the Santa Cruz Department of Bolivia.

Google Earth Historical Imagery (May 2006) shows  of an original  runway unobstructed by trees and brush. Later images by HERE/Nokia and Bing Maps show no length of clear runway.

See also

Transport in Bolivia
List of airports in Bolivia

References

External links 
OpenStreetMap - Cuevo Airport

Defunct airports
Airports in Santa Cruz Department (Bolivia)